Joseph J. Ellick (April 3, 1854 – April 21, 1923) was a 19th-century Major League Baseball player. He was also briefly the player-manager of the Chicago Browns/Pittsburgh Stogies of the Union Association, compiling a record of 6–6 with one tie.

See also
List of Major League Baseball player–managers

Sources

1854 births
1923 deaths
St. Louis Red Stockings players
Milwaukee Grays players
Worcester Ruby Legs players
Chicago Browns/Pittsburgh Stogies players
Chicago Browns/Pittsburgh Stogies managers
Kansas City Cowboys (UA) players
Baltimore Monumentals players
Major League Baseball right fielders
Major League Baseball shortstops
Baseball players from Cincinnati
19th-century baseball players
St. Paul Red Caps players
Milwaukee (minor league baseball) players
Washington Nationals (minor league) players
Baltimore (minor league baseball) players
Nationals of Washington players
Springfield, Illinois (minor league baseball) players
Kansas City Cowboys (minor league) players
Major League Baseball player-managers